This is a list of produced films and TV series by Los Angeles-based production company Silver Pictures, established on June 24, 1980, by Hollywood producer Joel Silver, currently run by Hal Sadoff as CEO and Susan Downey. Silver Pictures is also owner of his subsidiary Dark Castle Entertainment, established in 1999 by Silver with Robert Zemeckis and Gilbert Adler, currently run by Downey and Steve Richards.

Films

Television series

Highest-grossing films

References 

Silver Pictures
S
 List of productions